Rebel Dykes is a 2021 documentary film directed by Siân A. Williams and Harri Shanahan about the lesbian scene in London during the 1980s and 1990s.

In 2021 the film won the Iris Prize Best Feature Award,  the Best Documentary Award at Pornfilmfestival Berlin, a Special Jury Mention at the KASHISH Mumbai International Queer Film Festival, and was nominated for The Raindance Discovery Award at the British Independent Film Awards and the Best Feature Film Award at the Scottish BAFTA. 

Siobhan Fahey set up Riot Productions to produce Rebel Dykes.

Synopsis 
The film is a documentary, the narrative told by the cast, with archive footage, images and animation (the latter created by Harri Shanahan).

The history covers some of the cast's experiences at the Greenham Common Women's Peace Camp,  the S&M club Chain Reaction, protests against the introduction of Section 28 including the lesbian invasion on the BBC, abseilers into the House of Lords and the impact of AIDS on the LGBTQ+ community as well as the homophobia of the era. It goes onto follow the women now into their lives, some living on women's communes, still performing drag cabaret at the Royal Vauxhall Tavern and covering a recent reminiscence gathering event at DIY Space For London.

The film also has a prominent soundtrack, with bands such as Poison Girls, The Brendas, The Sleeze Sisters, Sluts from Outer Space, Amy and the angels, Mouth Almighty, The Petticoats, Sister George, Well Oiled Sisters and the Gymslips being mentioned and their music included to narrate the story.

Cast
Del LaGrace Volcano
Debbie Smith
Lisa Power
Roz Kaveney

Reception
The film received a 100% rating at Rotten Tomatoes based on 8 reviews, as of 10 May 2022.

Rebel Dykes History Project 
Aside from the film, the Rebel Dykes History Project has been a longer project made up of oral histories, art exhibitions, other short films and more.

Alongside the film release, the Rebel Dykes Art & Archive Show exhibition was held at Space Station Sixty-Five gallery in Kennington, south London in 2021. It was curated by Atalanta Kernick, with Kat Hudson from Lesley Magazine.

The Rebel Dykes Archive is held at the Bishopsgate Library at Bishopsgate Institute, London.

References

External links

Documentary films about lesbians
Documentary films about LGBT culture
2021 independent films
2020s English-language films
British documentary films
Lesbian culture in the United Kingdom
2021 LGBT-related films
British LGBT-related films